The Algerian Ligue Professionnelle 1, known as Championnat National de Première Division or Ligue 1 for short, and formerly known as the Championnat National 1, is the Algerian professional league for association football clubs. It is the country's primary football competition and serves as the top division of the Algerian football league system. Administered by the Ligue de Football Professionnel, it is contested by 16 clubs, with the two lowest-placed teams at the end of each season being relegated to the Ligue 2 and replaced by the top two teams in that division. In 2009 it was known as Championnat d'Algérie D1 Nedjma and from 2010 to 2014, it was known as Ligue Professionnelle 1 Nedjma as it is sponsored by Kuwaiti telecommunications company Nedjma. From 2014, the league is officially known as Ligue Professionnelle 1 Mobilis as it is sponsored by Algerian telecommunications company Mobilis.

The league was created in 1962, when Algeria became an independent nation. Until 1950, only regional leagues (Algiers, Constantine, Oran) were contested. Some 'national' playoffs were played in the first decade of the 20th century, first in 1904. Between 1920 and 1956 the winners played off for the North African Championship, together with league winners from Morocco and Tunisia.

Between 1957 and 1962, a North African Championship without participation from Morocco and Tunisia (which had gained independence) was organised as the "Algerian championship".

On 21 August 2010, the FAF announced that the name of the league would change to Ligue Professionnelle 1 to reflect the professionalization of the league.

History

Algerian football origins (1897–1962) 
The history of football in Algeria is closely linked to the French football. When football appeared in France in the year 1872, it appeared in its turn naturally around 1894 in North Africa, a region of the world subject to French authority. The first clubs were founded in Oran, CDJ Oran (Club des Joyeuseté) was founded on 14 April 1894, this club created its football section on 10 July 1897. The second club CAL Oran (Club Athlétique Liberté Oranais) was founded with his football section on 28 September 1897 under the name of Club Athlétique Oranais.

As a result, football was progressively developed in the French Algeria for more than half a century with the creation of a large number of clubs but also organizations that governed its practice in departmental and inter-regional competitions. Then it came to an end in the year 1962, when Algeria became the last territory in North Africa to abandon French rule and thus saw the end of colonial French football.

The Division Honneur 1963–1964, Second edition of the championship 
The championship is once again modified during the season 1963–1964. After a very complex competition season regional tournaments organized on a system comprising several groups, with some cases a regional final and a final tournament designating the first champion of Algeria; Algerian football leaders managed to reach a certain elite. Most teams that participated in the competition last season are grouped into three regional divisions. The championship then took the name of ephemeral DH, the "Honor Division". Unlike the previous season, instead of many individual groups composed three regions or regional football leagues, only one group per region was implemented.
 

Following these regional championships, for the Western region or West Division Honneur, the ASM Oran was crowned regional champion after a final victory two goals to one against his rival of Oran on MC Oran and qualified for the national tournament with striker Abdelkader Reguig surnamed Pons.
For the Central Region or Division Honneur Center, the NA Hussein Dey cap on the pole on the final day its direct rival, the CR Belcourt thanks to their goalkeeper Amirat, Senior contributor to the qualification of its team in the national tournament, annihilating attempts playmaker chabibiste Hacène Lalmas.
As for the East region or Eastern Division Honneur is even the USM Annaba former USM Bone winner of the group I qualified for the second consecutive year the final tournament with his player coach Mohamed Boufermès. She beats the departmental final MSP Batna winner of Group II.

This time the three were regional champions met in Constantine to determine who will win the second title. As the edition takes place in this city, it was decided that the fourth team to accompany the three champions, the dolphin would be the Honorary Division of the League of Constantine, the MSP Batna. After the competition, the USM Annaba winner in the semifinals of the ASM Oran), will be needed in the final against NA Hussein Dey (winner of him MSP Batna), a score of one goal to nil. This is to date the first and only league title usmistes of Annaba.

National Division One or Division One, the national elite 
After two competitive seasons in the form of regional tournaments with a final national tournament, the Algerian Football Federation reorganized once again the championship. This time she opted during the season 1964-1965 to create a national championship to direct confrontation between the sixteen best teams of the three regional leagues of Algerian football. For this, she referred the results of last season including the first five of each of the regional leagues and more regional champion of the season.

So we had for the Western region or League Oranie the first five teams (the ASM Oran the MC Oran, the ES Mostaganem the MC Saida and JSM Tiaret) to the center of Algiers region or League again the first five teams (the CR Belouizdad the NA Hussein Dey, the USM Blida the MC Algiers and USM Alger) and the Eastern region or Constantine League champion last season the USM Annaba and the following five of the ranking of this region (the MSP Batna, the ES Guelma, the ES Sétif, the USM Setif and MO Constantine).
 Different formulas of the first division.

Domination CR Belouizdad (4 titles) – (1965–1971) 

The CR Belcourt (later CR Belouizdad) is a new club at this time, from the district of Belcourt to Algiers which will be renamed Belouizdad. This club was born from the merger of two former clubs from the same district, WRB (Widad Riadhi Belcourt) and the CAB (Club Athéltique Belcourt).

These two former clubs were known for playing football competitions in the French colonial era, for both affiliated to the FFFA (French Football Federation Association) and LAFA (League Algiers Football Association).
In the sixties, this team has dominated the national football by winning no fewer than four titles between seasons 1964–1965 and 1970–1971. She realized the performance to make two doubles championships in seasons 1964–1965 – 1965–1966, then during the season 1968–1969 – 1969–1970.
This team, led by Yahia Ahmed Saadi and then Arab Zitoun, was composed of the best players representing the backbone of the Algerian selection apart from those from the French colonial clubs such Hamiti of Racing Universitaire d'Alger or Djemaâ of Gallia Sport Algiers. This talented team was distinguished in all competitions in both Algeria at Maghreb (with the gain of three Maghreb Champions Cup consecutive winning).
His two main rivals were the ES Sétif Salhi of brothers, who managed to grab the title of the season 1967–1968 and MC Oran who won his first trophy in the season 1970-1971, with the generation Fréha – Hadefi, having narrowly missed the season 1968–1969; and especially that of the season 1967–1968 (dolphin of the ES Sétif but ahead of the CR Belouizdad third in the ranking).

Rivalry: MC Alger (5 titles) – JS Kabylie (4 titles) – (1972–1980) 

The seventies marked the takeover of MC Algiers, though not everything was simple. The club experienced its first relegation before that, partly due to serious events that occurred in the season 1964–1965 against the MC Oran. It took three years at the club to regain the first division and a good staff; but this absence was perhaps beneficial, with the winning five league titles Algeria. The team, managed by the duo of Khabatou Zouba and coaches, will succeed even to achieve the feat twice during championship seasons 1974–1975 and 1975–1976. However the most resounding achievement of this decade for this team occurred when the season 1975–1976. Indeed, that season, the MC Algiers succeeds tripled Algeria Championship – Algerian Cup – African Cup of Champion Clubs', which is unique in the Algerian football.

The dominance of this team of MC Algiers will still be contested by the JS Kabylie, which succeed in this decade to glean four league titles Algeria. This team which reached the generation of Mouloud Iboud, captain for nearly nine years, was nicknamed "steamroller" as she won victories. The club will also be the second after the CR Belouizdad and just before the MC Algiers to realize a double championship in seasons 1972–1973 and 1973–1974, and a double Algerian Cup – of Algerian Football Championship when the season 1976–1977. Unlike other teams in the championship, it will be one of the first formations to experiment, after the passage of the former Goalkeeper of the FLN football team, Abderrahmane Boubekeur, several foreign coaches. The team was managed by the French Jean Lemaître (season 1970–1971), Christian Banjou (midseason 1974–1975 and midseason 1975–1976), but also by the Yugoslav Jouan Cestic (season 1973-1974), Hungarian André Nagy (mid-season 1976–1977) and Romanians with the duo first Virgil Popescu and Petre Mândru (season 1972–1973 year of the first title), then Bazil Marian (during the season 1973–1974). The most famous of these early foreign coaches is probably the Polish Stefan Zywotko, which formed at the end of this decade a duet with Mahieddine Khalef that will last nearly twelve years.

During that decade, a sports reform was held by the Ministry of Youth and Sports precisely in the season 1975–1976, to give the elite clubs a good financial base in order to empower them to structure themselves in a professional manner (ASP Sports Association Performance '). The aim was therefore they have full autonomy management with the creation of their own training center. For that many clubs had to sacrifice their names and rename them after the main sponsor. It was thus possible to see in some clubs names letter Promoted oil of Sonatrach sponsor the MC Alger on MC Oran and ES Sétif, renamed MP Algiers, MP Oran and EP Setif. Similarly, the Sonelgaz, with the  'K'  of Kahraba (gas), sponsorisa the JS Kabylie, which gave its name to JS Kabylie in Jamiat Sari ' Kawkabi or the USM Alger, famous USK Algiers. But also CNAN (Compagnie National Algérienne de Navigation) with the M of Milaha (browser) that sponsorisa the Nasr Hussein Dey Athletic became Milaha Athletic Hussein Dey and many other more. Although for some time it will have allowed these clubs to form themselves into genuine independent sports clubs with the example of Mouloudia of Algiers, which flew past and continues to dominate sports competitions in other disciplines as football, it will fail because the clubs gradually resume in the following years their original names and démarcheront themselves many sponsors at a time.

Hegemony JS Kabylie (6 titles) – (1981–1990) 

The eighties are a good year for the Algerian football, who knew two of his qualifications national team in World Cup but also several good results of its clubs internationally. Nationally, a club comes off the lot: the JS Kabylie (JSK), Jeunesse Électronique de Tizi-Ouzou (JET). One can call this decade hegemony of the JE Tizi-Ouzou, as this team, managed by the famous duo of coaches the Polish Stefan Zywotko and Mahieddine Khalef s Algerian dominant football of his time, both nationally and internationally, embodying the success of Algerian football.

She never ceased to break records, by raking in ten years no less than six titles of "Champion of Algeria," also gleaning in passing three cups of Algeria and winning two titles of champion of Africa, hence its nickname of "Jumbo Jet" characterizing the greatness of this team.

His hold on the championship as it was reached outside of these six titles, twice the second place in the season 1980–1981 and 1987–1988 and a third place in the season 1983–1984, nine times in ten years on the podium . The peculiarity of these titles is that they were won three times twice, i.e. by producing doubled in the league and therefore obtaining the status of "double champion" in seasons 1981–1982 – 1982–1983 and 1984–1985 – 1985–1986, and then 1988–1989 – 1989–1990. During his victories in that decade, the JE Tizi-Ouzou made two doubled African Cup – Algerian Championship during the season 1980-1981 and 1989–1990, and his second double Algerian Cup – Algerian Championship in the season 1985–1986. It is also during this season that the team realized a record total at year end ninety-eight points on the board, in thirty-eight games (in a championship consists of twenty teams).

This hegemony will still be slightly challenged by the MC Oran named MP Oran, who was at that time only rival figure of JE Tizi-Ouzou, removing his second championship when the season 1987–1988. With this title she will stand in the next season African Cup of Champions Clubs, losing the final against the Moroccan WA Casablanca. Besides this achievement of African weapons, Mouloudia Oran finish second in the championship three times in the season 1984–1985, 1986–1987 and 1989–1990.

Consecration of the beautiful can also emphasize GC Mascara, a pioneer of Algerian football club, one of the few to win a championship in the French colonial era (since affiliated with the Lofa Oran Football League Association'), who won the championship at the end of the season 1983–1984. Note also the performance of the RC Kouba, named at that time RS Kouba who finally won his first championship (the only one to date) in the season 1980–1981, after finishing second in the season 1966–1967 and 1974–1975. And finally the last team to win a championship in this decade apart from JE Tizi-Ouzou is the ES Sétif which then bore the name of EP Setif. She won her second championship during the season 1986–1987, which will allow him the following season to participate in the African Cup of Champions Clubs won the Nigerian side of the Iwuanyanwu National.

The era of MC Oran (2 titles) and other – (1991–1999) 

Algerian football knows at this time the consecration of his national team with the gain of two major titles, the Africa Cup of Nations during 1990, organized its territory and Intercontinental Cup the following year, the late Afro-Asian Cup of Nations. Nationally no uncontested leadership emerges in this decade as was the case in previous decades to the CR Belouizdad on MC Algiers or JS Kabylie.

However, if we were to hold a team that would be beyond dispute that the MC Oran. The "Hamroua" as they are nicknamed are the only ones in this decade to win the largest number of shares, or acquired in two seasons 1991–1992 and 1992–1993. This is the fourth club to achieve a championship doubled after CR Belouizdad, the JS Kabylie and MC Algiers.

This marks a clear difference between the other competitors at this time is in addition to its two league titles, the MC Oran finished in second place in the championship three consecutive times during the season 1994–1995, 1995–1996 and 1996–1997. Let's mention the great performance of this team competing in Arabic because it was involved in the defunct Arab Cup Winners' Cup. Indeed, after his victory in the final of the Algerian Cup face the USM Blida after editing 1996, the MC Oran chooses to participate in the Arab competition she won two times consecutively in 1997 and 1998, and even win the Arab Super Cup the following year.

Apart from winning the championship regulars like JS Kabylie who distinguished himself during the season 1994-1995 by a third doubled African Cup – Championship with obtaining the African Cup Winners' Cup; of the USM Alger who finally won his second league title (expected for the season 1962–1963) the following year when the season 1995–1996 and the MC Algiers who won his sixth championship in the season 1994–1995; This decade marks a first achievement for several teams.

So the club Constantine on MO Constantine, also pioneer club championship of Algeria, who was one of the few during the French colonial era to win a championship (because affiliated with the LCFA the Constantine Football League Association), and finally also won its first championship of Algeria during the season 1991–1992, after finishing second in the season 1971–1972 and 1973–1974 . His rival Constantine, the CS Constantine will do the same in the season 1996–1997. Note the strong performance of the US Chaouia, the second club of "Berber" ethnic group after the JS Kabylie that wins a championship, this is their first title. Finally the USM El Harrach, another Algerian club, which also finally won a championship when the season 1997–1998, after finishing second in the season 1983–1984 and 1991–1992. During this decade, reform MJS (Ministry of Youth and Sports), adopted at the season 1976–1977 is finally abandoned, leaving the clubs resume their previous names. Another important fact, the championship was reorganized into two groups of eight teams in the season 1997–1998, and then into two pools of fourteen participants in the season 1998–1999. This formula therefore included "play off" when the two leaders of these groups at the end of the competition fought for the title of champion of winning. The edition of 1998–1999 even knew extensions between MC Algiers and JS Kabylie which saw the Mouloudia a goal to win zero.

The years of alternation: CR Belouizdad (2 titles) USM Alger (3 titles), JS Kabylie (2 titles) 

The championship has not experienced any real domination of a particular team over the two thousand years. However, there was a time when some teams alternately dominate each in turn. This is the case at the beginning of this decade CR Belouizdad who won championships. The league title eluded the club for nearly thirty years, since the season 1969–1970. The Algerian team of the district of Belouizdad so engrangea two more titles to his credit. They were earned during a doubled championship that is to say, consecutively, following the seasons 1999–2000 and 2000–2001. If at the beginning of this period we see the influence championship CR Belouizdad, another team was manifested at the end of this decade, it is the ES Sétif.
This team will also win two championships in seasons acquired 2006–2007 and 2008–2009 each time to the detriment the JS Kabylie. His titles allow him to enrich his record, a title of "champion of Algeria" she had not won since the season 1986–1987, almost twenty-one years. We must also add that it was distinguished in international competition by also winning two Arab Champions League consecutively at Editions 2006–2007 and 2007–2008.
Between these two teams or rather between these two periods, both teams stand out during this decade, it is the USM Alger and JS Kabylie. This team of USM Alger enjoyed a golden generation symbolized by one player Billel Dziri. This is the man in form this decade that allowed his teammates and his team to achieve so much achievement. The usmistes won the championship three times, including two consecutive seasons at 2001–2002 and 2002–2003 then 2004–2005. This is the fifth club to achieve a championship doubled after CR Belouizdad, the JS Kabylie on MC Algiers and MC Oran. If the team won three championships be warned it finishes in second place three times during the season also 2000–2001 (dolphin CR Belouizdad ), 2003–2004 and 2005-2006 (dolphin JS Kabylie). Note also gain three Algerian Cup, one of which he won in a dubbed Algerian Cup – Algerian Championship during the season 2002-2003.

With six titles in all competitions, it is clear that the USM Alger dominated much domestic football of his time. However, this rule will not be unchallenged because another team will also like to see better, it is the JS Kabylie. Like usmistes, canaries also won three championships in seasons 2003–2004, 2005–2006 and 2007–2008 and lacked a little cup double championship in the season 2003–2004 losing precisely the final of the Algerian Cup against the USM Alger. However apart from his three league titles, the JS Kabylie finish second in the championship four times in the season 2001–2002 (dolphin CR Belouizdad), 2004–2005 (dolphin of the USM Alger) 2006–2007 and 2008–2009 (dolphin of the ES Sétif). Added to this international performance, for three consecutive finals victories African Cup. Indeed, at the beginning of this period, JS Kabylie concerned by the African competition as engaged in CAF Cup, forsook somewhat the championship to concentrate only on the African Cup. This will pay off because it will be needed when editing 1999–2000 face the Egyptians to the Ismaily SC. Then come two more accolades in the same competition at Editions 2000–2001 Tunisians face of the Étoile du Sahel and 2001–2002 face of Cameroonians Tonnerre Yaoundé.

With six titles acquired during that decade including three international, the JS Kabylie so vied to great effect opposite to the USM Alger. Note finally that at the end of the fifth decade of the championship in Algeria, the MC Algiers is back in the winners of this competition, winning his seventh league title, after eleven years of absence.

Domination ES Sétif (5 titles) (2007–2015) 

This period consisted of two appearances by the national team in FIFA World Cup, qualifying in the fourth round in the World Cup 2014. This period is also that of the return of the ES Sétif on the national and international level, with 5 titles in nine seasons, 9 podiums out of 9 possible (one second and three times third) and unprecedented participation by the Algerian club in FIFA Club World Cup. Since 2007, the ES Sétif has dominated the Algerian championship, the Cup team is therefore a distant memory, in fact, except for the JS Kabylie successful with 11 consecutive podiums 6 consecrations between 1976 and 1986, no other team has so dominated the competition, domination of the ES Sétif is all the more practical that the club won in addition to the five league titles Algerian two Algerian Cup with the cup double / championship 2011-2012 (the second in the club's history after that achieved in season 1967-1968), and two consecutive league titles with the title of the season 2012-2013 after that of 2011-2012, the team also shone on the regional, continental and even global by becoming the first Algerian club in history to reach world cup of clubs when editing 2014 after winning Champions League CAF 2014, the club went on winning the African Super Cup in 2015. the ES Sétif won a total of 14 titles in all competitions in just 9 years (a record).

Given the dominance of the ES Sétif no other club has been able to maintain the rivalry with Sétif for several seasons because each season brought her new batch of competitors who challenged the grip of the eagle Black highland on the championship, that's why the league has had 4 different winners in addition to ES Sétif in nine seasons, these two clubs played the relegation prompted systematically or three seasons or even a single season after their coronation, was the case of MC Alger sacred in 2010 and USM Alger in 2014, both narrowly saved the season from the JS Kabylie of its iconic president Mohand Cherif Hannachi who managed the coronation in 2008 fled from relegation to one day of the end of the season 2010-2011 That said, the most successful club in Algeria still managed three podiums in addition to his coronation at that time, the club ASO Chlef in holy 2011 and dolphin 2008 has meanwhile failed to maintain when the season 2014-2015, it is also the club where the JSM Bejaia Double vice champion in Algeria 2011 and 2012, which met the same fate in the season 2013-2014. The phenomenon is partly explained by the fact that the champion of Algeria and the runner-up are called the next season to represent Algeria in the African champions league. This competition takes place mostly during the summer period, and is very costly in terms of energy, time and money, due to the nature of the African continent, whose climate, long distances between countries, and in some countries, lack of infrastructure both sporting and otherwise, are not always to the advantage of Algerian teams. the ES Sétif is the only team not affected by the phenomenon

Qualification for African competitions

Association ranking for 2021–22 CAF competitions
Association ranking for 2021–22 CAF Champions League and 2021–22 CAF Confederation Cup will be based on results from each CAF tournament (Champions League and Confederation Cup) from 2017 to 2020–21.

Legend
 CL: CAF Champions League
 CC: CAF Confederation Cup

Sponsorship 
The Algerian Ligue Professionnelle 1 has been sponsored since 2009. The sponsor has been able to determine the league's sponsorship name. There have been two sponsors since the league's formation.

 2009–2010: Nedjma (Championnat d'Algérie D1 Nedjma)
 2010–2014: Nedjma (Ligue Professionnelle 1 Nedjma)
 2014–2019: ATM Mobilis (Ligue Professionnelle 1 Mobilis)

Media coverage 

The EPTV Group has the  broadcast rights of the Algerian Ligue Professionnelle 1 since independence.
Number of Algerian private channels offer special league programs and highlights.

Current members of the Ligue Professionnelle 1 (2022–23 season)

Participating clubs

Format 
The teams play a double round-robin. The Top 2 qualify to the CAF Champions League, the 3rd place qualifies to the CAF Confederation Cup, alongside the Algerian Cup winner.

Clubs

Champions

Teams in bold compete in the Ligue Professionnelle 1 as of 2020–21 season.
In total, 15 clubs have won the Algerian championship, The record champions are JS Kabylie with 14 titles.

League participation  
As of 2022, 60 clubs have participated.
Note: The tallies below include up to the 2020–21 season.

Current stadiums
Note: Table lists in alphabetical order.

Players

Records

This table shows the ranking of the top scorers and players who played the most matches of Algerian Ligue Professionnelle 1.

Bold Still playing in Algerian Ligue Professionnelle 1
Last update: As of 17 June 2022

Players with most appearances

All-time top scorers

Foreign players with most appearances

All-time table (1964-2022) 
The all-time Algerian Ligue Professionnelle 1 table is a cumulative record of all match results, points and goals of every team that has played in the Algerian Ligue Professionnelle 1 since its inception in 1964. The table that follows is accurate as of the end of the 2021–22 season. Teams in bold are part of the 2022–23. Numbers in bold are the record (highest either positive or negative) numbers in each column.

League or status at 2019–20:

Best finish in African and international competitions by club

See also 
 Algerian Cup
 Algerian Super Cup
 Algerian League Cup

References

External links 
 League at fifa.com
 RSSSF list of champions

 
Top level football leagues in Africa
1
Sports leagues established in 1962
Football